Season 1876–77 was the second season in which Heart of Midlothian competed at a Scottish national level, entering the Scottish Cup for the second time.

Overview 
Hearts entered the Scottish Cup for the second time. However they failed to turn up for the match and the game was awarded to Dunfermline.

Results

Friendlies

Scottish Cup

See also
List of Heart of Midlothian F.C. seasons

References 

 Statistical Record 76-77

External links 
 Official Club website

Heart of Midlothian F.C. seasons
Hea